Nueba Yol (Spanish: Nueba Yol: Por fin llegó Balbuena) is a 1995 Dominican comedy-drama film directed by Ángel Muñiz. The film was selected as the Dominican entry for the Best Foreign Language Film at the 68th Academy Awards, but was not accepted as a nominee.

Cast
 Luisito Martí as Balbuena
 Caridad Ravelo as Nancy
 Raúl Carbonell as Fellito
 Rafael Villalona as Pedro
 Joel Garcia as Pancho

See also
 List of submissions to the 68th Academy Awards for Best Foreign Language Film
 List of Dominican submissions for the Academy Award for Best Foreign Language Film

References

External links
 

1995 films
1995 comedy-drama films
Dominican Republic comedy-drama films
1990s Spanish-language films